The Camden Indians were an American basketball team based in Camden, New Jersey that was a member of the American Basketball League.

During the 1942/43 season, the team became the Brooklyn Indians on January 18, 1943.

Year-by-year

Defunct basketball teams in the United States
Basketball teams in New Jersey
Sports in Camden, New Jersey
1942 establishments in New Jersey
1943 disestablishments in New Jersey
Basketball teams established in 1942
Basketball teams disestablished in 1943